Shaquanzi is a small town in Xinjiang, China about 100 km from the border with Kazakhstan.

Transport
The town is served by the original railway which connected China with Kazakhstan via Druzhba, Kazakhstan and Alashankou, China in the early 1990s. 

In 2008, a BOOT scheme proposes to build a more direct line to Almaty in Kazakhstan which would branch off the existing line in the vicinity of this town.

References

Populated places in Xinjiang